Metzudat Ze'ev (lit. "Ze'ev's fortress / stronghold") is an office building on 38 King George Street in Tel Aviv, Israel. It is also known as Beit Jabotinsky (lit. "Jabotinsky's House") or  HaMetzuda (lit. "the fortress / stronghold").

History
Metzudat Ze'ev is one of the oldest towers in Tel Aviv. It is built on the site of the shack that, during the 1930s, served as the headquarters of the Revisionist Zionism movement, Betar youth movement, and as the secret meeting place of the Irgun fighters.

In 1936, these movements consolidated a plan for a new building. The building's architect was Mordechai Ben-Horin. Built in a Brutalist style, its construction lasted until 1963.

The building is named after the founder of the Revisionist Zionism movement, Ze'ev Jabotinsky and served as the headquarters of the Herut party headed by Menachem Begin, the predecessor of the Likud party.

When it was still a three-floor building, the Betar youth conducted their meetings in the inner courtyard, where a big mural slogan stated: "The Betar Bow has not turned back, and the sword-head of Betar shall not return in vain, Amen!"

On the night of the 1977 "political upheaval", when for the first time in Israel's history, the right wing won an election, Menachem Begin delivered his victory speech to an audience of party activists in the Independence Hall of the building.

Today, the building houses the Likud party's staff, the Betar movement, the Herut Women organization, the Mishkei Herut Beitar settlement movement, the Jabotinsky Institute in Israel and Jabotinsky Museum, the Irgun Museum and the Partisans and Fighters Museum. The rest is occupied by businesses.

See also
Architecture of Israel

References

External links
 Jabotinsky Institute in Israel website

Buildings and structures in Tel Aviv
Office buildings completed in 1963
1963 establishments in Israel
Likud
Headquarters of political parties
Revisionist Zionism
Brutalist architecture in Israel